Teihens Football Club is a Japanese football club based in Ishikawa Prefecture.  The club plays in the 1st division of the Ishikawa Prefecture League.

History 
The club was formed in 1968 by Teihei Kuwabara. They competed in the District League until 1976. During their period they made their first appearance in the Emperor's Cup. In 1977 they were promoted to the Hokushinetsu Football League.

Teihens is one of the most successful amateur clubs in Ishikawa. They won the 1991 Hokushinetsu Football League, the Ishikawa's Prefectural Cup and Prefectural League eight and four times, respectively.

Honours 
 Hokushinetsu Football League
 1991
 Ishikawa Prefectural Cup
 1996, 1997, 1998, 1999, 2000, 2001, 2002, 2006
 Ishikawa Prefectural League
 2008, 2018, 2019, 2021

References

External links 
  

Football clubs in Japan
Association football clubs established in 1968
Sports teams in Ishikawa Prefecture
1968 establishments in Japan